Red Camp may refer to:

 Howie "Red" Camp (1893–1960), American baseball outfielder
 Red Camp, a Soviet partisan detachment force led by Abbasgulu bey Shadlinski
 RED (Roadmap to Explore and Discover) Camp, a 3-day non-residential experiential camp for graduating secondary school students by Ngee Ann Polytechnic